The Speaker of the House of Keys is the principal officer of the House of Keys, the lower house of the Isle of Man legislature. The Speaker is elected from the membership of the House at its first sitting after an election. He is responsible for controlling the procedure of the House and for the authoritative interpretation of its standing orders. He sets the business of the House and authorises the order of business of the House for each sitting. The Speaker uses the letters SHK after his name.

The Speaker is not entitled to speak in debates in the House, but is entitled to vote. If a vote is tied, convention dictates that he votes to continue debate or retain the status quo. However the Speaker is entitled to, and does, speak in debates in Tynwald Court.

All Speakers from 1750 to 1898 were members of either the Moore or the Taubman families or married into them. Until 1866, the Keys were unelected.

Before the House was first elected in 1867 the role of Speaker was assumed to be for life. Thus when Edward Moore Gawne resigned in 1867, he was the first Speaker not to die in office. Since then, although it is possible to resign the office, or nowadays even to fail to be re-elected, all Speakers died in office until Charles Kerruish in 1990, with the exception of John Robert Kerruish, who was elected to the Legislative Council in 1919. Since then none have died in office.

Speakers dress in the same official dress as the Speaker of the House of Commons: a black silk damask gold lace robe with full bottom wig for state occasions and a black silk gown for normal day business. The current robe was donated by the Speaker of the House of Commons in 1966 to commemorate the centenary of popular elections to the House of Keys.

On 27 September 2016, Juan Watterson was elected as Speaker, the youngest person to hold the office since John Senhouse Goldie-Taubman.

Chairmen of the House of the Keys
Richard Stevenson, c.1649–c.1660
Edward Christian, c.1660–1673
Charles Christian, 1673–1697 
Thomas Stevenson, 1697–1704
John Stevenson, 1704–1738
Thomas Heywood, 1738–1758

Speakers of the House of Keys
George Moore, 1758–1780
John Taubman, 1780–1799
John Taubman, 1799–1823
Mark Wilks, 1823–1831
Alexander John Goldie, 1831–1844
John Taubman Goldie-Taubman, 1844–1847
John Moore, 1847–1854
Edward Moore Gawne, 1854–1867
John Senhouse Goldie-Taubman, 1867–1898
Arthur William Moore, 1898–1909
Dalrymple Maitland, 1909–1919
John Robert Kerruish, 1919
George Frederick Clucas, 1919–1937
Joseph Davidson Qualtrough, 1937–1960
Henry Knowles Corlett, 1960–1962
Charles Kerruish, 1962–1990
George Victor Harris Kneale, 1990–1991
James Crookall Cain, 1991–1996
Noel Quayle Cringle, 1996–2000
John David Qualtrough Cannan, 2000–2001
Tony Brown, 2001–2006
Steve Rodan, 2006–2016
Juan Watterson, 2016–present

Recent elections

*Following the election of Noel Cringle as President of Tynwald

Chairs of lower houses
Chairs of subnational legislatures
Politics of the Isle of Man